Wilfred von Oven (4 May 1912 – 13 June 2008) was a German journalist, publicist and civil servant who served as the Press Adjutant of Propaganda Minister Joseph Goebbels between 1943 and the German capitulation in 1945.

Biography
Wilfred von Oven was born in La Paz, Bolivia to German parents, the father's side having a strong military tradition. His father fell in Flanders in 1917: two uncles held high rank in the German Army, and of these Ernst von Oven (1859-1945) was the highest ranking German officer in the field at the Armistice and subsequently reported directly to the Minister of Defence. Both helped form Freikorps to combat communism and the revolutionary movement in Germany.

Wilfred von Oven joined the SA and National Socialist German Workers Party on 1 May 1931, but resigned from both exactly one year later in protest at the shift of Nazism further to the right (the "Stennes Revolt"). Oven was interested in journalism and served with the Legion Condor in Spain as a war correspondent. After obtaining an Army commission in 1939 he served with the Propaganda Ministry as a war correspondent reporting from the fronts in Poland and the Soviet Union during the Second World War. In 1943, with the rank of Lieutenant, the OKW appointed him as Goebbels' Press adjutant, which he remained until the end of the war.

In a German TV documentary on the "German Resistance", Oven described the events of the 20 July plot which he witnessed. On the afternoon in question the Propaganda Ministry on the Wilhelmstrasse, with Goebbels inside, was surrounded by disloyal troops. Goebbels ordered Oven to discover whether escape was possible. He found they were trapped but reported that the telephone system was still working, an oversight by the plotters which assisted in their downfall.

At the capitulation in 1945 Oven went into hiding under an assumed name to escape Allied internment: Werner Naumann, the replacement Propaganda Minister for Goebbels whose assistant Oven would have been, fled to Argentina in 1946, where Oven arrived in 1951.  Oven was declared "persona non grata" by the Federal German Embassy in Buenos Aires and remained a committed Nazi. He continued to reject Christianity for paganism in Argentina. He was married, and the author of several books and numerous magazine articles.

In his book Auschwitz: The Nazis and The 'Final Solution''', Laurence Rees discusses an interview he conducted with Oven. He was asked if he could sum up his experience of the Third Reich in one word, what would it be, to which Oven responded: "Paradise".

Wilfred von Oven died in Buenos Aires, Argentina at 13 June 2008.

References

Literature
 Wilfred von Oven: Mit ruhig festem Schritt – Aus der Geschichte der SA'', 1998.

External links
 

1912 births
2008 deaths
Argentine people of German descent
Bolivian people of German descent
Bolivian emigrants to Argentina
Nazi propagandists
German Army officers of World War II
Adherents of Germanic neopaganism
People from La Paz
Nazis in South America
Condor Legion personnel
People of the Federal Intelligence Service
German modern pagans